Sustainable event management (also known as event greening) is the process used to produce an event with particular concern for environmental, economic and social issues. Sustainability in event management incorporates socially and environmentally responsible decision making into the planning, organisation and implementation of, and participation in, an event. It involves including sustainable development principles and practices in all levels of event organisation, and aims to ensure that an event is hosted responsibly. It represents the total package of interventions at an event, and needs to be done in an integrated manner. Event greening should start at the inception of the project, and should involve all the key role players, such as clients, organisers, venues, sub-contractors and suppliers.

History 
The first time that environmental concerns were raised by the public was at the 1992 Albertville Winter Olympics in France, which led to the first ‘green Games’ in Lillehammer, Norway, in 1994. The Lillehammer Olympic Organizing Committee received the UNEP Global 500 Award for setting environmental standards which were absent from previous Olympic games.

The Centennial Olympic Congress, Congress of Unity, held in Paris in 1994, recognised the importance of the environment and sustainable development, which led to the inclusion of a paragraph in Rule 2 of the Olympic Charter. The International Olympic Committee (IOC) has acknowledged its particular responsibility in terms of promoting sustainable development, and regards the environment as the third dimension of Olympism, alongside sport and culture. This led to its decision in 1995 to create an IOC Sport and Environment Commission.

Environmental Guidelines for the Summer Olympics were developed to guide Olympic hosts to ensure that facilities are constructed in a more environmentally friendly manner. The Guidelines were successfully used in the 2000 Sydney Olympic Games. As a result, the organizers of the Sydney Games were honoured with the Global 500 Award in 2001 for organizing the greenest games ever. Since then, other major sports events have also considered their environmental impact.

A major aspect of UNEP’s work is with the IOC. A cooperative agreement was signed in 1994 with IOC and an Agenda 21 for Sport and Environment developed. Since 2002, UNEP has participated in a task force of the UN Secretary-General on the use of sport for the implementation of the United Nations Development Goals.  UNEP also supports the IOC in organizing world conferences and regional seminars on sport and the environment.

During the 2006 FIFA World Cup in Germany, Green Goal was launched, which was also implemented in South Africa for the 2010 FIFA World Cup. The Host City Cape Town Green Goal programme had been awarded the International Olympic Committee (IOC) Sport and Environment Award. Nominated by FIFA, the award recognised the efforts of the Host City Cape Town to mitigate negative environmental impacts of the FIFA World Cup and to maximise a positive environmental and social legacy.

Event greening is however not only limited to sports events, and other examples include the World Summit on Sustainable Development (WSSD), Johannesburg 2002, and UNFCCC 15th Conference of the Parties (COP15) held in Copenhagen in 2010.

Monitoring and evaluation 
Monitoring and evaluation is an essential component of event greening, and should be used to make continuous improvement. A detailed plan needs to be in place to ensure that information is gathered on all aspects of the event – before, during, and also after the event. This ensures that information is available to understand the effects of greening interventions (e.g. to what extent was water used, and how did water-saving measures reduce water use), as well as the potential improvements to future event-greening initiatives.

With large events it is best to ensure an independent report, which complies with international standards, such as the Global Reporting Initiative (GRI). The GRI Event Organizers Supplement provides organizations in the sector with a tailored version of GRI's Reporting Guidelines. It includes the original Guidelines, which set out the Reporting Principles, Disclosures on Management Approach and Performance Indicators for economic, environmental and social issues. The Event Organizers Supplement's capture the issues that matter most for event organizers to be reported on:
 Site selection
 Transport of attendees
 Recruiting and training of the event workforce, participants and volunteers
 Sourcing of materials, supplies and services
 Managing impacts on communities, natural environments, and local and global economies.
 Planning and managing potential legacies
 Accessibility of an event

The British Standard (BS 8901) has been developed specifically for the events industry with a purpose of helping the industry to operate in a more sustainable manner. The standard defines the requirements for a sustainability event management system to ensure an enduring and balanced approach to economic activity, environmental responsibility and social progress relating to events.

It requires organizations to identify and understand the effects that their activities have on the environment, on society and on the economy both within the organization and the wider economy; and put measures in place to minimize the negative effects.  These standards will however be replaced by the International Standard (ISO 20121) for Sustainability Management Systems.

See also 
 Event management

References

External links 
 ISO 20121 Sustainable Event Management at the British Standards Institution
 Sustainable Event Alliance
 Sustainable Event Management: A Practical Guide

Event management
Event management